Harold Francis Uplinger (September 30, 1929 – February 1, 2011) was an American professional basketball player and television producer.

A 6'4" (1.93 m) guard from Long Island University, Uplinger spent the 1953–54 NBA season with the Baltimore Bullets, scoring 86 points in 23 games.

He was the Northern League basketball player of the year at John Marshall High School, and an All-Los Angeles City player as well, going on to play for the National Championship Junior College team at Los Angeles City College before playing at L.I.U. for legendary coach Clair Bee.  He is the only Marshall High School (opened in 1931) basketball player to ever play in the NBA.

Television producer
He worked for CBS in Los Angeles and New York as the production manager at KCBS, then as sports producer for the CBS Television Network.
He  produced the American side of Live Aid and was responsible for the international distribution of the 16-hour broadcast  to 155 countries and raised $283.7 million for the Band Aid Trust. Uplinger produced many world wide TV broadcasts mainly using top musical talent promoting humanitarian themes.

He is considered to be the co-founder, along with Tony Verna, of the system used to present instant replays on television.

References

External links
 

1929 births
2011 deaths
Amateur Athletic Union men's basketball players
American men's basketball players
Baltimore Bullets (1944–1954) players
Basketball players from Los Angeles
Basketball players from Pennsylvania
LIU Brooklyn Blackbirds men's basketball players
Los Angeles City Cubs men's basketball players
People from New Kensington, Pennsylvania
Shooting guards
Undrafted National Basketball Association players
University of Arizona alumni